Sebastian Joseph-Day (born March 21, 1995) is an American football defensive end for the Los Angeles Chargers of the National Football League (NFL). He played college football at Rutgers.

Early years
Joseph-Day attended and played high school football at Stroudsburg High School in Stroudsburg, Pennsylvania. He played for the Mountaineers under head coach Joe Bernard. He was rated as the No. 30 prospect out of the state of Pennsylvania by Rivals.com. Before choosing to commit to Rutgers to play college football, he received offers from Connecticut, Maryland, and Temple.

College career
Joseph-Day attended and played college football for Rutgers University from 2013–2017 under head coaches Kyle Flood and Chris Ash. In the 2013 season, he appeared in one game, which came against Norfolk State, and recorded one tackle. He ended up redshirting after suffering an injury. In the 2014 season, he appeared in three games and recorded three total tackles on the season. He saw an expanded role in the 2015 season. He appeared in 11 games and recorded 22 total tackles, 5.5 tackles-for-loss, one sack, and one fumble recovery. In the 2016 season, he appeared in 11 games and recorded 29 total tackles, 3.5 tackles-for-loss, one sack, one pass defensed, and one forced fumble. In his final collegiate season, in 2017, he appeared in 11 games and recorded 35 total tackles, 4.5 tackles-for-loss, 1.5 sacks, one pass defensed, and one forced fumble.

Collegiate statistics

Professional career

Los Angeles Rams
Joseph-Day was drafted by the Los Angeles Rams in the sixth round (195th overall) of the 2018 NFL Draft. He was the second member of the Scarlet Knights selected that year after Kemoko Turay went to the Indianapolis Colts in the second round.

After being inactive for every game as a rookie, Joseph-Day was named a full-time starter in 2019. In the 2019 season, he finished with two sacks, 44 total tackles, and one pass defended. In the 2020 season, he finished with one sack, 55 total tackles, three passes defended, and one forced fumble.

On November 5, 2021, Joseph-Day was placed on injured reserve after undergoing surgery for a torn pectoral. He finished the 2021 regular season with three sacks and 38 total tackles in seven games. He was activated off injured reserve on February 11, 2022, in time for Super Bowl LVI. The Rams won 23-20 against the Cincinnati Bengals.

Los Angeles Chargers
On March 16, 2022, Joseph-Day signed a three-year, $24 million contract with the Los Angeles Chargers. In Week 7, against the Seattle Seahawks, he recorded a safety when him and teammate Troy Reeder tackled Kenneth Walker in the end zone. In the 2022 season, he appeared in 16 games. He finished with two sacks, 56 total tackles, one interception, one pass defended, and one forced fumble.

Personal life 
Joseph-Day appeared with Mike Tyson as a fill-in co-host on his podcast "Hotboxin' with Mike Tyson". The opportunity to continue co-hosting was offered and accepted. Joseph-Day hosts a restaurant tour series on his YouTube channel called "Dine n' Bash". In July 2021, he launched a charitable initiative called "Bashing Hunger." The effort is designed to combat food insecurity by raising awareness of the issue, increasing food rescue to feed people without enough food, and providing nutritional education.

References

External links

Los Angeles Chargers bio
Rutgers Scarlet Knights bio

1995 births
Living people
American football defensive tackles
Los Angeles Rams players
People from Stroudsburg, Pennsylvania
Players of American football from Pennsylvania
Rutgers Scarlet Knights football players
Sportspeople from the New York metropolitan area
Los Angeles Chargers players